The Wollaston Islands are uninhabited members of the Arctic Archipelago in the territory of Nunavut. Located on the east side of the mouth of Navy Board Inlet, the island group is closer to Bylot Island than to Baffin Island.

References

External links 
 Wollaston Islands (Nunavut) in the Atlas of Canada - Toporama; Natural Resources Canada

Uninhabited islands of Qikiqtaaluk Region